Predrag Peđa Milosavljević (Lužani, Kragujevac, Kingdom of Serbia 1908 — Belgrade, Yugoslavia 1989) was painter, lawyer, diplomat and dramaturge and member of Serbian Academy of Sciences and Arts. He received the Grand Prix during the International exhibition in Paris in 1937.

One street in Belgrade on Bežanijska kosa was named after him.

Selected works 
 Između trube i tišine, book of essay
 Zopir, drama

See also
 List of painters from Serbia

External links 
 Short biography on web site Slikarstvo.net
 Short biography on website of Serbian Academy of Science and Arts

Serbian painters
1908 births
1989 deaths
Members of the Serbian Academy of Sciences and Arts
Dramaturges
20th-century dramatists and playwrights